Nigeria competed at the 2020 Summer Paralympics in Tokyo, Japan, from 24 August and 5 September 2021. This was their eighth consecutive appearance at the Summer Paralympics since 1992.

Medalists

Competitors
The following is the list of number of competitors participating in the Games:

Athletics 

Flora Ugwunwa qualified to compete in the women's javelin throw F54 event. She qualified after winning the silver medal in the women's javelin throw F54 event at the 2019 World Para Athletics Championships held in Dubai, United Arab Emirates. Lauritta Onye qualified to compete in the women's shot put F40 event.

Powerlifting

Source:

Rowing

Nigeria qualified one boats in the men's single sculls events for the games by winning the gold medal at the 2019 FISA African Qualification Regatta in Tunis, Tunisia.

Qualification Legend: FA=Final A (medal); FB=Final B (non-medal); R=Repechage

Table tennis

Nigeria entered six athletes into the table tennis competition at the games. Five athletes qualified from 2019 ITTF African Para Championships which was held in Alexandria, Egypt and Isau Ogunkunle via World Ranking allocation.

Men

Women

See also 

 Nigeria at the Paralympics
 Nigeria at the 2020 Summer Olympics

References 

Nations at the 2020 Summer Paralympics
2020
2021 in Nigerian sport